The 2006–07 UEFA Cup was the 36th UEFA Cup, Europe's second-tier club football tournament. On 16 May 2007, at Hampden Park, Glasgow, Scotland, Sevilla won their second consecutive UEFA Cup, defeating Espanyol 3–1 on penalties after the match finished 2–2 after extra time. Sevilla became the first side to win the competition two years in a row since Real Madrid achieved this feat in 1985 and 1986.

Walter Pandiani of Espanyol was the top goalscorer of this UEFA Cup edition with 11 goals scored.

Association team allocation
A total of 155 teams from 52 UEFA associations participated in the 2006–07 UEFA Cup. Associations were allocated places according to their 2005 UEFA league coefficient, which takes into account their performance in European competitions from 2000–01 to 2004–05.

Below is the qualification scheme for the 2006–07 UEFA Cup:
Associations 1–6, 16–21 each have three teams qualify
Associations 7 and 8 each have four teams qualify
Associations 9–15, 22–39, 41-50 each have two teams qualify
Associations 40, 51 and 52 each have one team qualify
The top three associations of the 2005–06 UEFA Fair Play ranking each gain an additional berth
Eleven winning teams from the 2006 UEFA Intertoto Cup
24 teams from the 2006–07 UEFA Champions League (eight third-placed teams from the group stage and the sixteen losers of the third qualifying round)

Association ranking

Notes
(FP): Additional fair play berth (Norway, Belgium, Sweden).
Number of teams do not include teams transferred from the Intertoto Cup.

Distribution
The title holder would have been given an additional entry if they did not qualify for the 2006–07 UEFA Champions League or UEFA Cup through domestic performance; however, this additional entry was not necessary as Sevilla, winners of the 2005–06 UEFA Cup, qualified for the UEFA Cup through domestic performance. This means that the following changes to the default allocation system were made to compensate for the vacant title holder spot in the group stage:

The first UEFA Cup qualifying entrant of association 14 (Austria) gained direct access to the 1st round – Pasching.
The domestic cup winners of associations 19 and 20 (Switzerland and Norway) are moved from the first qualifying round to the second qualifying round.

Teams
The labels in the parentheses show how each team qualified for the place of its starting round:
 TH: Title holders
 CW: Cup winners
 CR: Cup runners-up
 LC: League Cup winners
 Nth: League position
 PO: End-of-season European competition play-offs (winners or position)
 IC: Intertoto Cup
 FP: Fair play
 CL: Relegated from the Champions League
 GS: Third-placed teams from the group stage
 Q3: Losers from the third qualifying round

Notes

Early issues

Italian match-fixing scandal
The 2006 Serie A scandal resulted in major changes to the clubs that originally qualified in Italy. Originally, Roma took the cup winners' place as losing finalists in the 2006 Coppa Italia, as the winners, Internazionale finished in the top four in the league and qualified for the Champions League. The other two UEFA Cup places initially went to Lazio and Chievo.

Lazio, however, as well as the remaining three Champions League qualifiers (Juventus, Milan and Fiorentina), were formally indicted on 22 June on charges relating to the scandal.

On 14 July, all four of the indicated clubs were penalised by an Italian court and the Italian Football Federation (FIGC). Results of the FIGC appeal were announced on 25 July. The impact on the UEFA Cup was:
Lazio were barred from European competition.
Roma and Chievo were promoted to the Champions League.
Palermo, Livorno and Parma were granted Italy's places in the UEFA Cup.

Greek Football Federation
FIFA suspended the Hellenic Football Federation (HFF) from all international competitions on 3 July 2006 because of "political interference in sport" after the Greek government passed a law, giving it control of the sports authorities in Greece. After the law was amended to address FIFA's objections, FIFA reinstated the HFF on 12 July. The Greek government in response, decided to withdraw all of its funding to the Hellenic Football Federation.

Qualifying rounds

First qualifying round
These matches were held on 13 July and 27 July 2006.

|-
!colspan="5"|Southern-Mediterranean region
|-

|-
!colspan="5"|Central-East region
|-

|-
!colspan="5"|Northern region
|-

|}

Second qualifying round
These matches were held on 8 and 10 August (first leg) and 24 August (second leg) 2006.

|-
!colspan="5"|Southern-Mediterranean region
|-

|-
!colspan="5"|Central-East region
|-

|-
!colspan="5"|Northern region
|-

|}

1Due to the armed conflict going on in Israel, UEFA decided that no European matches could be staged in the country until further notice. Hapoel Tel Aviv's home match was moved to Tilburg, Netherlands, Beitar Jerusalem's to Sofia, Bulgaria and Bnei Yehuda Tel Aviv's to Senec, Slovakia

2These clubs qualified for this season's UEFA competitions as members of the Football Association of Serbia and Montenegro during the 2005–06 season but are currently members of the Football Association of Serbia which is the official successor of the previous football association.

3Derry City are a team from Northern Ireland who play in the Republic of Ireland's football league. The flag of the Republic of Ireland is used for the purposes of official records as Derry City are a team representing the Football Association of Ireland.

First round

The matches were held on 14 September (first leg) and 28 September 2006 (second leg).

}

}

}

}

|}
4Due to the armed conflict in Israel, UEFA had ruled that European tournament matches could not be played in Israel until further notice. Maccabi Haifa's home leg on 14 September was moved to Nijmegen, Netherlands. On 15 September, UEFA lifted the ban, allowing future matches to be played in the Tel Aviv area. Hapoel Tel Aviv were able to play their home leg in Tel Aviv on 28 September.

5UEFA ordered Trabzonspor's home leg on 14 September to be played behind closed doors after objects were thrown at visiting fans and the fourth official, and a smoke bomb ignited in the stands, during their second qualifying round home leg against Cypriots APOEL. Trabzonspor appealed, and UEFA rejected the appeal on 13 September. Trabzonspor's penalty includes a second closed-doors game, a penalty which has been deferred for two years and will be removed if no further incidents occur.

Group stage

The top three teams (highlighted in green) of each group qualified for the next round. Based on paragraph 4.06 in the UEFA regulations for the current season, if two or more teams are equal on points on completion of all the group matches, the following criteria are applied to determine the rankings:
superior goal difference from all group matches played;
higher number of goals scored in all group matches played;
higher number of goals scored away in all group matches played;
higher number of wins;
higher number of away wins;
higher number of coefficient points accumulated by the club in question, as well as its association, over the previous five seasons (see paragraph 6.03 of the UEFA regulations).

Group A

Group B

Group C

Group D

Group E

Group F

Group G

Group H

Knockout stage

Bracket

Round of 32
The first legs were held on 14 February and 15 February 2007, while the second legs were held on 22 February 2007.

1 On 7 February, the Italian Government ruled that Parma and Livorno's home fields did not meet requirements following riots held after an Italian Serie A match in Sicily. Livorno played its home leg behind closed doors on 14 February. Parma played its home leg behind closed doors on 22 February.

2 On 19 January, UEFA declared that Feyenoord had been disqualified after a member of their crowd threw a glass of beer at Morten Gamst Pedersen in their group stage match at home to Blackburn Rovers. UEFA announced on 25 January that Tottenham Hotspur had received a bye. This was confirmed after a final appeal.

Round of 16
The first legs were held on 8 March 2007, while the second legs were held on 14 and 15 March 2007.

Quarter-finals
The draw for the final stages, included quarter-finals and semi-finals, was held on 16 March 2007 in Glasgow, Scotland. The quarter-final matches were played on 5 April and 12 April 2007.

Semi-finals
The semi-final matches were played on 26 April and 3 May 2007.

Final

Top goalscorers

See also
2006–07 UEFA Champions League
2006 UEFA Intertoto Cup
2007 UEFA Super Cup

References

External links

2006–07 All matches UEFA Cup – season at UEFA website
 All scorers 2006–07 UEFA Cup according to (excluding preliminary round) according to protocols UEFA + all scorers preliminary round
2006/07 UEFA Cup – results and line-ups (archive)
Contenders await group stage draw – 2006/07 UEFA Cup group stage seeding pots

 
UEFA Cup seasons
2006–07 in European football